Priscilla Hon ; 韓天遇 (born 10 May 1998) is an Australian tennis player.

She reached career-high WTA rankings in singles of No. 118 in October 2019, and No. 91 in doubles in April 2018.

Personal life
Hon was born in Brisbane in 1998 to Chinese parents who immigrated to Australia from Hong Kong in 1966. As a young child, she was encouraged to pursue many different athletic pursuits.

Career

Juniors
On the junior circuit, Hon achieved a career-high ranking of No. 13 in the world. She reached the semifinals of the 2014 Wimbledon Championships girls' doubles.

2015
In January ear 2015 at age 16, Hon made her senior Grand Slam main-draw debut at the Australian Open, as one of seven wildcard teams in women's doubles, partnering with fellow Australian Kimberly Birrell who was also age 16. They lost to the fifth-seeded Americans Raquel Kops-Jones and Abigail Spears in straight sets. Hon was also given a wildcard into the singles qualifying draw, but lost in the first round to tenth seed Evgeniya Rodina in straight sets.

In March, Hon won her first ITF tournaments at the $15k event in Mornington where she claimed the singles title defeating Sandra Zaniewska in the final as well as claiming the doubles title alongside Tammi Patterson.

Hon continued her doubles success throughout the year, winning another three titles in Melbourne, Pula and Leipzig, as well as the final of Tweed Heads.
She won her second ITF singles title at the $25k event in Brisbane, defeating fellow Australian junior and good friend Kimberly Birrell in the final, 6–4, 6–3.

2016
Hon was given a wildcard into the main draw of the Brisbane International, but she lost to Samantha Crawford, in straight sets. Hon was awarded a main-draw wildcard into the Australian Open, after winning the U-18 National Championships in December 2015. She lost in round one to Annika Beck, in straight sets.
In May, Hon won her first title outside of Australia, defeating Jessica Crivelletto in the final of the ITF Santa Margherita di Pula. She ended 2016 with a singles rank of 499.

2017
In August, Hon qualified for and made the semifinals of the Challenger de Gatineau.
In September, she qualified for the Korea Open and won her first WTA Tour match against Karolína Muchová. Hon defeated Arantxa Rus to make the quarterfinals, where was defeated by Richèl Hogenkamp. She ended the year with a singles rank of 227.

2018

She lost in the final round of qualifying for the Australian Open, and competed on the ITF Circuit with limited success. In May, she lost in the first round of qualifying for the French Open. In June, she reached the semifinals of the Surbiton Trophy. Hon lost in the second round of qualifying for Wimbledon. She ended 2018 with a singles rank of 158.

2019
Hon commenced at Brisbane, where she was awarded a wildcard and lost to Harriet Dart in round one. At the Sydney International, she defeated Tatjana Maria in round one before losing to Aliaksandra Sasnovich. At the Australian Open, she also was awarded a wildcard but lost in the first round to Astra Sharma.

In February, Hon represented Australia for the first time in Fed Cup partnering with Ashleigh Barty in doubles. The pair won the deciding rubber (6–4, 7–5) against the U.S. team resulting in Australia progressing to the semifinal.

In May, Hon achieved her first main-draw win at a Grand Slam tournament by defeating Tímea Babos, 3–6, 6–2, 6–1 at the French Open before falling to eventual quarterfinalist Madison Keys, in three sets in the second round.

Hon experienced limited success on grass courts in Europe, falling in the second round of qualifying at Wimbledon.

In August, Hon travelled to North America and reached the quarterfinal of the Vancouver Open. At the US Open, she qualified for the singles main draw, before losing to Margarita Gasparyan in the first round. Hon returned to Australia and reached the semifinal of the Bendigo International. She ended the season with a singles rank of 126.

2020
Hon commenced 2020 losing the first round in Brisbane and Adelaide. At the Australian Open, she reached the second round for the first time by defeating Kateryna Kozlova. Hon lost in her second round to Angelique Kerber. In February, Hon qualified for the Qatar Open, before losing in the first round to Ajla Tomljanović. In March 2020, Hon lost in the first round of Lyon Open, before the COVID-19 pandemic stopped all tournaments. 

During the COVID-19 hiatus, Hon suffered a hip injury which kept her out of action for almost a year. She ended 2020 with a singles rank of 147.

2021
Hon's first competitive match for 2021 was in the first round of French Open qualifying, where she lost.

In June 2021, Hon finished runner-up in the women's doubles competition of the ITF Nottingham event with Storm Sanders.

Hon reached the final round of Wimbledon qualifying. In September, she qualified for the Columbus Challenger and made the second round. She ended season with a singles rank of 263 and a doubles ranking of 559.

2022: First top 20 win
Hon commenced 2022 at the Adelaide International 1, where she scored her first top-20 win, defeating world No. 17, Petra Kvitová, in three sets. Following this performance, Hon was awarded a wildcard into the Australian Open.

Performance timelines

Only main-draw results in WTA Tour, Grand Slam tournaments, Fed Cup/Billie Jean King Cup and Olympic Games are included in win–loss records.

Singles
Current after the 2023 Adelaide International.

Doubles

ITF Circuit finals

Singles: 9 (7 titles, 2 runner-up)

Doubles: 14 (10 titles, 4 runner–ups)

Notes

References

External links
 
 
 

1998 births
Living people
Australian female tennis players
Tennis players from Brisbane
Australian people of Hong Kong descent
Tennis players at the 2014 Summer Youth Olympics